Johann Schulz (born 22 April 1897, date of death unknown) was a German sports shooter. He competed in the 50 m rifle event at the 1936 Summer Olympics.

References

1897 births
Year of death missing
German male sport shooters
Olympic shooters of Germany
Shooters at the 1936 Summer Olympics
Place of birth missing